The Valenzuela Gateway Complex, also known as the Valenzuela Gateway Complex Terminal and Valenzuela Gateway Complex (VGC) Central Integrated Terminal is an inter-regional intermodal transit hub in Valenzuela, Metro Manila, the Philippines. It is planned to be one of three provincial bus stations serving Metro Manila and the principal terminal for province-bound and incoming buses from Central and Northern Luzon regions.

Location

The Valenzuela Gateway Complex Terminal is located on a  site in Paso de Blas, east-central Valenzuela. It is situated alongside East Service Road of the North Luzon Expressway at its junction with Paso de Blas Road at the Paso de Blas (Valenzuela City) Interchange and opposite Puregold Paso de Blas. Nearby landmarks include the Malinta Market and the  former Plastic City manufacturing estate being redeveloped by Ayala Land into a mixed-use urban complex.

History
The Valenzuela terminal started its interim operation on August 15, 2018. A provincial bus ban on EDSA was announced earlier in the month with the Metropolitan Manila Development Authority (MMDA) announcing that nine bus companies serving the provinces of Bataan, Bulacan, Pampanga, Zambales, Pangasinan, Baguio, Ilocos Sur and Cagayan Valley and 1,954 buses would be accommodated at the new terminal. The terminal is part of a traffic reduction plan by MMDA that aims to free up the busy highway of some 2,276 northbound provincial buses. The plan also includes building two other provincial bus terminals in the south of the region for southbound provincial buses and the eventual closure of all 46 bus terminals on EDSA.

The ban on provincial buses along EDSA was deferred until the completion of certain facilities and infrastructure at the Valenzuela terminal. The House of Representatives of the Philippines also expressed its concern over the designation of the Valenzuela terminal as Metro Manila's northern terminal citing its limited space, lack of infrastructure, and narrow streets, among others.

In March 2019, the MMDA announced the relocation of all provincial bus operators to the three designated provincial bus terminals including Valenzuela, and the permanent closure of all EDSA bus terminals starting June 2019.

See also
 Parañaque Integrated Terminal Exchange

References

Bus stations in Metro Manila
Buildings and structures in Valenzuela, Metro Manila